Dahaneh Tangal (also known as Dahaneh Tangal-e Āb Garm and Darb-e Tangal) is a village in Heruz Rural District, Kuhsaran District, Ravar County, Kerman Province, Iran. At the 2006 census, its population was 27, in 7 families.

References 

Populated places in Ravar County